The Woonasquatucket River Site (RI-163) is a prehistoric archaeological site in Smithfield, Rhode Island.  The site contains Late Archaic artifacts, primarily stone flakes indicative of stone toolmaking activity. It is located in the George Washington Grove Wildlife Management Area, near where the Farnum Pike crosses the Woonasquatucket River.

See also
National Register of Historic Places listings in Providence County, Rhode Island

References

Archaeological sites on the National Register of Historic Places in Rhode Island
Buildings and structures in Providence County, Rhode Island
National Register of Historic Places in Providence County, Rhode Island